Dead to Fall is an American metalcore band from Gurnee, Illinois. Formed in 1999, it drew influences from Gothenburg metal, death metal, and other genres. Their first two albums reached combined sales of 60,000 copies in the US alone.

Dead to Fall broke up on April 6, 2008 due to financial and personal problems. In 2015, The band did a small reunion tour with the remaining previous members of the band. The tour was supporting Darkest Hour for the tenth anniversary of their album Undoing Ruin. The band announced April 5, 2017 that they are planning to release a new album in 2018.

Discography 

 Everything I Touch Falls to Pieces (September 10, 2002)
 Villainy & Virtue (September 14, 2004)
 The Phoenix Throne (April 4, 2006)
 Are You Serious? (February 19, 2008)

Members 

Current members
 Jonathan Hunt – lead vocals (1999–2008, 2015, 2017–present)
 Timothy Java – drums (2004–2008, 2015, 2022-present)
 Justin Jakimiak – bass (1999–2005, 2017–present)
 Antone Jones – guitar (1999, 2003, 2017–present)
 Bryan Lear – guitar (1999–2003, 2017–present)

Former members
 Aaron Cosgrove – vocals (1999)
 Andy Dalen – vocals (1999)
 Matt Hartman – guitar (1999–2002)
 Daniel Craig – drums (1999–2002, 2003, 2017–2022)
 Brad King – drums (2002–2003)
 Evan Kaplan – drums (2003–2004)
 Seth Nichols – guitar (2002–2003)
 Matt Matera – guitar (2003–2005)
 Aaron Nelson – guitar (2005–2007)
 Chris Nolan – bass (2005)
 Logan Kelly – lead guitar (2004–2008, 2015)
 Phil Merriman – rhythm guitar (2007–2008, 2015)
 Chad Fjerstad – bass guitar (2005–2008, 2015)

Timeline

References

External links 

 Dead to Fall Myspace
 Archive of official website

Metalcore musical groups from Illinois
American deathcore musical groups
Musical groups from Chicago
Victory Records artists
Musical groups established in 1999
Musical groups disestablished in 2008
1999 establishments in Illinois